The Monumental Axis is a central avenue in Brasília's city design.

The avenue begins on the National Congress of Brazil building and is considered part of the DF-002 road. Its first section is known as "Ministries Esplanade" ("Esplanada dos Ministérios"), as it is surrounded by ministries buildings.  Many important government buildings, monuments and memorials are located on the Monumental Axis.

A common urban legend persists that the Monumental Axis is the widest road in the world, where "[100 to 160] cars can drive side by side".  This is untrue, as the road consists of two avenues with six lanes on either side; a total of twelve lanes. However, the street has been featured in the Guinness Book of Records as having the widest median strip of a highway in the world.

On April 21, 2008, a year before they formally broke up, the Mexican pop group RBD performed a free concert to a crowd of 500,000 on the Monumental Axis during Empezar Desde Cero Tour 2008. The show was to celebrate the 48th Anniversary of the founding of Brasília. It was recorded and released on DVD with the title Live in Brasilia. The crowd in attendance was the largest for which the group had performed.

Major sites on the Monumental Axis

See also 

 Brasília
 List of Oscar Niemeyer works
 National Mall

References

External links

Squares in Brazil
National squares
Buildings and structures in Brasília
Monuments and memorials in Brazil
Museum districts
Parks in Brazil
Tourist attractions in Brasília
Modernist architecture in Brazil